Love and Radio (stylized Love + Radio) is an American audio podcast directed by Nick van der Kolk and produced by Phil Dmochowski and Steven Jackson. Love and Radio originally began in 2005 as a series of self-distributed episodes, and the show later received support and distribution from NPR and Chicago Public Media. In 2014 Love and Radio joined the podcast network Radiotopia as one of its seven original shows and began producing episodes on a more regular monthly schedule. In May 2019 Love and Radio left Radiotopia to join the newly launched subscription-supported podcasting service Luminary, starting with their 8th season in May 2019.

Episodes of Love and Radio consist of stories, often presented in personal interviews, either focusing on a single story or sometimes related to a theme. A few segments include fiction, but most are non-fiction. The show's subjects have been described as "people on the cultural edge" and "intriguing characters who aren't quite who you think they are when you first meet them". The show also uses audio production techniques to give the interviews a musical and inventive quality.

In 2011, Love and Radio was awarded the Gold prize for best documentary by the Third Coast International Audio Festival for the episode "The Wisdom of Jay Thunderbolt", which revolves around an interview with a stay-at-home strip club manager. Roman Mars, one of the Third Coast judges, described the piece as "beautifully constructed and composed in ways that are subtle and unique." The show also won Third Coast Awards in 2013 for the episode "Jack and Ellen" and in 2015 for the episode "The Living Room". The Atlantic included the episode "The Living Room" on their list of "The 50 Best Podcast Episodes of 2015".

Episodes

References

External links
 

Audio podcasts
2005 podcast debuts
Radiotopia
Interview podcasts